Tangier is an unincorporated community in Woodward County, Oklahoma, United States. During the 1940s, there was a bentonite plant located two miles east of Tangier.

References

Unincorporated communities in Oklahoma